The 88th New York State Legislature, consisting of the New York State Senate and the New York State Assembly, met from January 3 to April 28, 1865, during the first year of Reuben E. Fenton's governorship, in Albany.

Background
Under the provisions of the New York Constitution of 1846, 32 Senators and 128 assemblymen were elected in single-seat districts; senators for a two-year term, assemblymen for a one-year term. The senatorial districts were made up of entire counties, except New York County (four districts) and Kings County (two districts). The Assembly districts were made up of entire towns, or city wards, forming a contiguous area, all within the same county.

At this time there were two major political parties: the Republican Party and the Democratic Party. The Democrats split over the civil war issue. The "War Democrats" and the Republicans formed a coalition known as the "Republican Union," and supported President Abraham Lincoln and the Union Army's war effort; the rump Democratic Party opposed the war, favoring a compromise with the South, and became known as "Peace Democrats" or "Copperheads."

Elections
The New York state election, 1864 was held on November 8. All four statewide elective offices up for election were carried by the Republican Union. Congressman Reuben E. Fenton and Speaker Thomas G. Alvord defeated the incumbent Gov. Horatio Seymour and Lt. David R. Floyd-Jones. The approximate party strength at this election, as expressed by the vote for Governor, was: Republican Union 369,000 and Democrats 361,000.

Sessions
The Legislature met for the regular session at the Old State Capitol in Albany on January 3, 1865; and adjourned on April 28.

George G. Hoskins (R) was elected Speaker with 72 votes against 50 for Abram B. Weaver (D).

On March 9, Charles J. Folger (R) was elected president pro tempore of the State Senate.

On April 4, the Legislature re-elected Victor M. Rice (R) as Superintendent of Public Instruction.

State Senate

Districts

 1st District: Queens, Richmond and Suffolk counties
 2nd District: 1st, 2nd, 3rd, 4th, 5th, 7th, 11th, 13th and 19th wards of the City of Brooklyn
 3rd District: 6th, 8th, 9th, 10th, 12th, 14th, 15th, 16th, 17th and 18th wards of the City of Brooklyn; and all towns in Kings County
 4th District: 1st, 2nd, 3rd, 4th, 5th, 6th, 7th, 8th and 14th wards of New York City
 5th District: 10th, 11th, 13th and 17th wards of New York City
 6th District: 9th, 15th, 16th and 18th wards of New York City
 7th District: 12th, 19th, 20th, 21st and 22nd wards of New York City
 8th District: Putnam, Rockland and Westchester counties
 9th District: Orange and Sullivan counties
 10th District: Greene and Ulster counties
 11th District: Columbia and Dutchess counties
 12th District: Rensselaer and Washington counties
 13th District: Albany County
 14th District: Delaware, Schenectady  and Schoharie counties
 15th District: Fulton, Hamilton, Montgomery and Saratoga counties
 16th District: Clinton, Essex and Warren counties
 17th District: Franklin and St. Lawrence counties
 18th District: Jefferson and Lewis counties
 19th District: Oneida County
 20th District: Herkimer and Otsego counties
 21st District: Oswego County
 22nd District: Onondaga County
 23rd District: Chenango, Cortland and Madison counties
 24th District: Broome, Tompkins and Tioga counties
 25th District: Cayuga and Wayne counties
 26th District: Ontario, Seneca and Yates counties
 27th District: Chemung, Schuyler and Steuben counties
 28th District: Monroe County
 29th District: Genesee, Niagara and Orleans counties
 30th District: Allegany, Livingston and Wyoming counties
 31st District: Erie County
 32nd District: Cattaraugus and Chautauqua counties

Note: There are now 62 counties in the State of New York. What is now Bronx County was then part of Westchester County, while what is now Nassau County was part of Queens County.

Members

The asterisk (*) denotes members of the previous Legislature who continued in office as members of this Legislature.

Employees
 Clerk: James Terwilliger
 Sergeant-at-Arms: Azel B. Hull
 Assistant Sergeant-at-Arms: Sanders Wilson
 Doorkeeper: Lawrence Van Duzen
 First Assistant Doorkeeper: Casper Walter
 Second Assistant Doorkeeper: Edmund Traver
 Third Assistant Doorkeeper: Anson W. Johnson

State Assembly

Assemblymen
The asterisk (*) denotes members of the previous Legislature who continued as members of this Legislature.

Party affiliations follow the vote for Speaker.

Employees
 Clerk:  Joseph B. Cushman
 Sergeant-at-Arms: Charles E. Young
 Doorkeeper: Henry A. Rogers
 First Assistant Doorkeeper: Richard S. Stout
 Second Assistant Doorkeeper: Alexander Frier

Notes

Sources
 The New York Civil List compiled by Franklin Benjamin Hough, Stephen C. Hutchins and Edgar Albert Werner (1870; see pg. 439 for Senate districts; pg. 443 for senators; pg. 450–463 for Assembly districts; and pg. 501ff for assemblymen)
 Journal of the Assembly (88th Session) (1865)
 Documents of the Senate (87th Session) (1864; No. 104: "Report of the Committee on Privileges and Elections in the Matter of the Contested Election in the Ninth Senatorial District")

088
1865 in New York (state)
1865 U.S. legislative sessions